Edward C. Krause (December 14, 1914 – November 20, 1950) was an American politician and businessman from Wisconsin.

Biography
Born in La Crosse, Wisconsin, Krause graduated from La Crosse Central High School in 1932 and went to La Crosse State Teachers College. From 1941 until 1947, he served in the Wisconsin State Assembly as a Republican. During that time, he worked in a freight transportation company. In 1946, Ray Bice defeated Krause for reelection in the primary election. He worked for the Oscar Mayer Company in Madison, Wisconsin, after his defeat. He committed suicide in La Crosse by shooting himself with a police officer's revolver at his former wife's house.

References

External links

1914 births
1950 deaths
Republican Party members of the Wisconsin State Assembly
University of Wisconsin–La Crosse alumni
Politicians from La Crosse, Wisconsin
American politicians who committed suicide
Suicides by firearm in Wisconsin
20th-century American politicians
La Crosse Central High School alumni